North Acton is a London Underground station in North Acton, west London in the London Borough of Ealing. The station is on the Central line between East Acton and Hanger Lane on the West Ruislip Branch and West Acton on the Ealing Broadway Branch. It is on the boundary of Travelcard Zone 2 and Zone 3.

History

The joint "New North Main Line" (NNML; the present day Acton–Northolt line) of the Great Central and Great Western opened in 1903 and its North Acton Halt railway station followed in 1904, though it was closed by 1913. The Great Western Railway (GWR) built the Ealing & Shepherd's Bush Railway, which connected the Central London Railway (CLR) with the GWR's Ealing Broadway station. CLR trains began using the route on 3 August 1920. As Transport for London explains:

North of the Central line tracks were two freight lines, removed in the 1960s, running alongside the Central line as far as White City; to the north of those at a slightly higher level were the two tracks of the NNML. The NNML platforms closed when the Central line was extended on new track from North Acton to Greenford station in 1947. Today, only the outer-most NNML platform remains partially intact, having been removed in the early 1950s.

Between South Ruislip station and Old Oak Junction, the GWR line was progressively run down, and in many places it is now single-track, including the stretch running past North Acton, which was reduced to single-track in 1993. From May 2008 until December 2018 only freight trains and a once-daily passenger service provided by Chiltern Railways used this stretch of line.

The Underground station had only two platforms until 1992, whereby for operational flexibility an island platform was created by building a third platform north of the other two, where the old freight line track bed had been. The third platform became the eastbound road while the eastbound platform (now the middle platform) was resignalled to allow it to be used also for terminating and starting services. This change allows shuttle services to be run to White City from Ealing Broadway and from West Ruislip in the event of problems elsewhere on the Central line, and at certain times of the day some trains coming from central London are scheduled to terminate at North Acton .

Today

Passenger access is down from the booking hall, which is part-way down the southern side of the cutting with two exits up to Victoria Road.
This is the last station before the Central line splits into the West Ruislip and Ealing Broadway branches. Approximately half the trains stopping at the station head to each destination. The support centre for Carphone Warehouse and numerous other companies have offices in the vicinity. There are approximately 600 new flats directly opposite the station, and there is a Holiday Inn Express hotel next door to the station with the Ramada Encore hotel another five minutes' walk away. A Tesco Express store is also open along with a Lebanese restaurant in the opposite block.

Development
There have been vague and uncosted suggestions over the years to move the station to the east to provide an interchange with the North London Line. This would, however, be in an area with no extra passenger generation, and merely to move the station for interchange purposes has never been sufficient reason. The idea was revived in February 2008, when the Greater London Authority stated in a 'Park Royal draft Opportunity Area Planning Framework' that

In 2004, the multinational Diageo company agreed to build Central line platforms at Park Royal station to the west of North Acton, as part of its First Central business park, built on the site of the now demolished Guinness brewery. By 2017 this had not yet happened. Such a new station might influence whether adjacent stations were ever moved (particularly Hanger Lane station not far to the west). The entrance to a 'North London Line' North Acton station could be just a few metres on the other side of Victoria Road from the current North Acton station eastern entrance. There is a footpath to the west immediately next to the railway, from nearby Chase Road to Park Royal Road.

Connections
London Buses routes 95, 218, 260, 266, 440, 487 and N266 serve the station.

Gallery

References

Central line (London Underground) stations
London Underground Night Tube stations
Tube stations in the London Borough of Ealing
Former Great Western Railway stations
Railway stations in Great Britain opened in 1923
Acton, London